The Asinaro is a river in Sicily in the province of Syracuse.  It is 22 km long, flowing from the Hyblaean Mountains into the Ionian Sea.  It passes through the UNESCO World Heritage city of Noto.
The river was known as the Assinaros in antiquity; in 413 BC it was the site of the final crushing defeat of the retreating Athenian expeditionary force which had been besieging Syracuse.

References

Rivers of Italy
Rivers of the Province of Syracuse
Drainage basins of the Ionian Sea